Georgia Beth Davies (born 11 October 1990) is a British competition swimmer who has represented Great Britain in the Olympic Games and European championships, and swam for Wales in the Commonwealth Games.  She has won gold in the Commonwealth Games and European Championships. She currently represents Energy Standard in the International Swimming League.

Career

Early career (2010-2012)
Georgia Davies made her senior breakthrough as part of the Wales team at the 2010 Commonwealth Games, entering 5 events. She won a bronze medal in the 50 metre backstroke. She also made the finals in the 100 metre backstroke, where she finished 6th, the 4x100 metre medley relay, where she finished 4th and the 4x200 metre freestyle relay, where she finished 6th. She also competed in the 200 metre freestyle, finishing 15th.

She competed for Team GB at the 2011 World Championships, where she made the final as part of the 4x100 metre medley team, eventually finishing 6th. She also competed in the 50m backstroke, finishing 10th and missing out on the final.

At the 2012 Summer Olympics, she competed in the women's 100-metre backstroke, finishing 6th in the heats. However, she was eliminated in the semifinal in 15th position.

Later career (2014-present)
Georgia Davies competed in 2 events in the 2013 World Championships, the 50 metre backstroke, where she made the final and finished 6th and the 100 metre backstroke, where she finished 19th.

In 2014, Davies won the gold medal in the 50 metre backstroke in a Games record, and silver in the 100 metre backstroke at the 2014 Commonwealth Games. A month later, she won silver in the 50m backstroke and bronze in the 100-metre backstroke and 4×100-metre medley relay at the 2014 European Championships.  She won the bronze medal in the 100 metre backstroke at the 2014 World Championships (SC).

She represented Team GB again in the 2016 Summer Olympics, where she competed in the 100 metre backstroke but again went out in the semifinals, finishing 10th. She made an Olympic final as part of the 4x100 metre medley relay team, finishing 7th.

At the 2017 World Championships, Davies made finals in the 4x100 metre medley relay and 50 metre backstroke, finishing 7th and 8th respectively. She also competed in the 100 metre backstroke, finishing 10th.

Davies represented Team Wales for the third time at the 2018 Commonwealth Games and Davies returned from Australia a double bronze medallist in the 50 metre backstroke and 4x100 metre medley relay.

At the 2018 European Championships, Davies won gold in the 50 metre backstroke finishing in 27.23 seconds.  She won another gold when she won as part of the team in the mixed 4 × 100m medley. She added a silver in the 100 metre backstroke, and a bronze in the women's 4 × 100 metre medley relay.

At the 2019 World Aquatics Championships held in Gwangju, South Korea, Davies won a bronze as part of the British team in the 4 × 100 m mixed medley relay.

International Swimming League 
In the Autumn of 2019 she was member of the inaugural International Swimming League swimming for the Energy Standard International Swim Club, who won the team title in Las Vegas, Nevada, in December.

References

External links
 
 
 
 
 
 
 
 

1990 births
Living people
British female swimmers
Welsh female swimmers
Female backstroke swimmers
Medalists at the FINA World Swimming Championships (25 m)
Olympic swimmers of Great Britain
Swimmers at the 2012 Summer Olympics
Swimmers at the 2016 Summer Olympics
Commonwealth Games medallists in swimming
Commonwealth Games gold medallists for Wales
Commonwealth Games silver medallists for Wales
Commonwealth Games bronze medallists for Wales
Swimmers at the 2014 Commonwealth Games
Swimmers at the 2018 Commonwealth Games
Sportspeople from London
Sportspeople from Swansea
People educated at Ysgol Gyfun Gŵyr
European Aquatics Championships medalists in swimming
20th-century British women
21st-century British women
Medallists at the 2014 Commonwealth Games
Medallists at the 2018 Commonwealth Games